LSC may refer to:

Astronomy
 Local Supercluster
 Virgo Supercluster

Science and technology
 Lanthanum strontium cobaltate, see lanthanum strontium cobalt ferrite
 Luzon Science Consortium
 Shaped charge#Linear shaped charges
 LIGO Scientific Collaboration
  Message Sequence Chart#Live Sequence Charts
 Luminescent solar concentrator
 Lichen simplex chronicus
 LDAP Synchronization Connector, an open source software to synchronize an LDAP directory with any other data source.
 Landing Support Craft, a British WWII landing craft, US called Landing Craft Assault
 Landing Ship, Carrier (Derrick-Hoisting) a US WW2 landing craft with a crane.

Places
 Lafayette School Corporation, Indiana, US
 Lake Superior College, Duluth, Minnesota, US
 La Salle College, Hong Kong
 Lyndon State College, Vermont, US
 London School of Commerce, London, UK
LSC, the IATA code for La Florida Airport, serving La Serena, Chile

Other
 LStar Capital, also known as LSC Film Corporation, a film production company that works with Sony Pictures
 Learning and Skills Council, former UK body
 Legal Services Commission, England, replaced by Legal Aid Agency
 Legal Services Corporation, US corporation providing legal aid
 Legend SuperCup, a legends car racing series since 2014
 Lengua de Señas Colombiana, the Colombian sign language
 Llengua de Signes Catalana, the Catalan sign language
 Local School Councils, Chicago, US
 Local Swimming Committee, a subdivision of USA Swimming
 London Society of Compositors, former British trade union
 London Symphony Chorus, UK
 Lone Star Conference, an athletic conference affiliated in the Division II ranks of the National Collegiate Athletic Association (NCAA)
 LSC, a coupe model of the Continental Mark VII and Lincoln Mark VII